Greg Hamilton (born 24 June 1968) is  a former Australian rules footballer who played with Richmond in the Victorian Football League (VFL).

Notes

External links 
		

Living people
1968 births
Australian rules footballers from Victoria (Australia)
Richmond Football Club players